Veniamin Veniaminovich Alexandrov (18 April 1937 – 6 November 1991) was a Soviet ice hockey player who played in the Soviet Hockey League. He played for CSKA Moscow. He was inducted into the Russian and Soviet Hockey Hall of Fame in 1963. After playing exhibition matches in North America in 1957, Alexandrov was put on the negotiation list of the Chicago Black Hawks, a team in the National Hockey League. While Soviet players were not expected to be able to move to North America, Chicago still felt highly enough of him to do so in the event that changed.

Career statistics

International

References

External links
 
Profile

1937 births
1991 deaths
Burials in Troyekurovskoye Cemetery
HC CSKA Moscow players
Ice hockey people from Moscow
Ice hockey players at the 1960 Winter Olympics
Ice hockey players at the 1964 Winter Olympics
Ice hockey players at the 1968 Winter Olympics
IIHF Hall of Fame inductees
Medalists at the 1960 Winter Olympics
Medalists at the 1964 Winter Olympics
Medalists at the 1968 Winter Olympics
Olympic bronze medalists for the Soviet Union
Olympic gold medalists for the Soviet Union
Olympic ice hockey players of the Soviet Union
Olympic medalists in ice hockey